The Linden Methodist Church is located in Linden, Wisconsin. It was added to the National Register of Historic Places in 1978.

References

Churches on the National Register of Historic Places in Wisconsin
Methodist churches in Wisconsin
Churches in Iowa County, Wisconsin
National Register of Historic Places in Iowa County, Wisconsin